Nuts and Volts is a 1964 Warner Bros. Looney Tunes cartoon short directed by Friz Freleng. The short was released on July 20, 1964, and stars Speedy Gonzales and Sylvester.

Plot 
After getting tired of chasing Speedy Gonzales around the house, Sylvester decides to try a more modern-technology approach by using a hi-tech security system and a robot to hunt down and catch Speedy.

Crew 
 Story: John Dunn
 Animation: Gerry Chiniquy, Virgil Ross, Bob Matz, Art Leonardi, Lee Halpern
 Layout: Hawley Pratt
 Backgrounds: Tom O'Loughlin
 Film Editor: Treg Brown
 Voice Characterizations: Mel Blanc
 Music: Bill Lava
 Produced by: David H. DePatie and Friz Freleng
 Directed by: Friz Freleng

Production
This was the final original WB cartoon directed by Friz Freleng. Once the studio closed in 1963 (the same year this cartoon was made), Freleng and former producer David H. DePatie would produce cartoons for Warner Bros. from 1964 to 1967 at DePatie-Freleng Enterprises.

References

External links 
 

1964 animated films
Looney Tunes shorts
Speedy Gonzales films
Sylvester the Cat films
Warner Bros. Cartoons animated short films
1964 short films
Short films directed by Friz Freleng
1964 films
Animated films about mice
Animated films about cats
Animated films about robots
Films set in Mexico
Films scored by William Lava
1960s Warner Bros. animated short films
1960s English-language films